A paradox is a logically self-contradictory statement or a statement that runs contrary to one's expectation. It is a statement that, despite apparently valid reasoning from true premises, leads to a seemingly self-contradictory or a logically unacceptable conclusion. A paradox usually involves contradictory-yet-interrelated elements that exist simultaneously and persist over time. They result in "persistent contradiction between interdependent elements" leading to a lasting "unity of opposites".

In logic, many paradoxes exist that are known to be invalid arguments, yet are nevertheless valuable in promoting critical thinking, while other paradoxes have revealed errors in definitions that were assumed to be rigorous, and have caused axioms of mathematics and logic to be re-examined. One example is Russell's paradox, which questions whether a "list of all lists that do not contain themselves" would include itself, and showed that attempts to found set theory on the identification of sets with properties or predicates were flawed. Others, such as Curry's paradox, cannot be easily resolved by making foundational changes in a logical system.

Examples outside logic include the ship of Theseus from philosophy, a paradox that questions whether a ship repaired over time by replacing each and all of its wooden parts, one at a time, would remain the same ship. Paradoxes can also take the form of images or other media. For example, M.C. Escher featured perspective-based paradoxes in many of his drawings, with walls that are regarded as floors from other points of view, and staircases that appear to climb endlessly.

In common usage, the word "paradox" often refers to statements that are ironic or unexpected, such as "the paradox that standing is more tiring than walking".

Introduction

Common themes in paradoxes include self-reference, infinite regress, circular definitions, and confusion or equivocation between different levels of abstraction.

Patrick Hughes outlines three laws of the paradox:
Self-referenceAn example is the statement "This statement is false", a form of the liar paradox. The statement is referring to itself. Another example of self-reference is the question of whether the barber shaves himself in the barber paradox. Yet another example involves the question "Is the answer to this question 'No'?"
Contradiction"This statement is false"; the statement cannot be false and true at the same time. Another example of contradiction is if a man talking to a genie wishes that wishes couldn't come true. This contradicts itself because if the genie grants their wish, they did not grant their wish, and if the genie refuses to grant their wish, then he did indeed grant their wish, therefore making it impossible either to grant or not grant their wish without leading to a contradiction.
Vicious circularity, or infinite regress "This statement is false"; if the statement is true, then the statement is false, thereby making the statement true. Another example of vicious circularity is the following group of statements:
 "The following sentence is true."
 "The previous sentence is false."

Other paradoxes involve false statements and half-truths ("'impossible' is not in my vocabulary") or rely on hasty assumptions (A father and his son are in a car crash; the father is killed and the boy is rushed to the hospital. The doctor says, "I can't operate on this boy. He's my son." There is no paradox, the doctor is the boy's mother.).

Paradoxes that are not based on a hidden error generally occur at the fringes of context or language, and require extending the context or language in order to lose their paradoxical quality. Paradoxes that arise from apparently intelligible uses of language are often of interest to logicians and philosophers. "This sentence is false" is an example of the well-known liar paradox: it is a sentence that cannot be consistently interpreted as either true or false, because if it is known to be false, then it can be inferred that it must be true, and if it is known to be true, then it can be inferred that it must be false. Russell's paradox, which shows that the notion of the set of all those sets that do not contain themselves leads to a contradiction, was instrumental in the development of modern logic and set theory.

Thought-experiments can also yield interesting paradoxes. The grandfather paradox, for example, would arise if a time-traveler were to kill his own grandfather before his mother or father had been conceived, thereby preventing his own birth. This is a specific example of the more general observation of the butterfly effect, or that a time-traveller's interaction with the past—however slight—would entail making changes that would, in turn, change the future in which the time-travel was yet to occur, and would thus change the circumstances of the time-travel itself.

Often a seemingly paradoxical conclusion arises from an inconsistent or inherently contradictory definition of the initial premise. In the case of that apparent paradox of a time-traveler killing his own grandfather, it is the inconsistency of defining the past to which he returns as being somehow different from the one that leads up to the future from which he begins his trip, but also insisting that he must have come to that past from the same future as the one that it leads up to.

Quine's classification

W. V. O. Quine (1962) distinguished between three classes of paradoxes:

According to Quine's classification of paradoxes:
 A veridical paradox produces a result that appears absurd, but is demonstrated to be true nonetheless. The paradox of Frederic's birthday in The Pirates of Penzance establishes the surprising fact that a twenty-one-year-old would have had only five birthdays had he been born on a leap day. Likewise, Arrow's impossibility theorem demonstrates difficulties in mapping voting results to the will of the people. Monty Hall paradox (or equivalently three prisoners problem) demonstrates that a decision that has an intuitive fifty–fifty chance is in fact heavily biased towards making a decision that, given the intuitive conclusion, the player would be unlikely to make. In 20th-century science, Hilbert's paradox of the Grand Hotel, Schrödinger's cat, Wigner's friend or the Ugly duckling theorem are famously vivid examples of a theory being taken to a logical but paradoxical end.
 A falsidical paradox establishes a result that not only appears false but actually is false, due to a fallacy in the demonstration. The various invalid mathematical proofs (e.g., that 1 = 2) are classic examples of this, often relying on a hidden division by zero. Another example is the inductive form of the horse paradox, which falsely generalises from true specific statements. Zeno's paradoxes are 'falsidical', concluding, for example, that a flying arrow never reaches its target or that a speedy runner cannot catch up to a tortoise with a small head-start. Therefore,  falsidical paradoxes can be classified as fallacious arguments.
 A paradox that is in neither class may be an antinomy, which reaches a self-contradictory result by properly applying accepted ways of reasoning. For example, the Grelling–Nelson paradox points out genuine problems in our understanding of the ideas of truth and description.

A fourth kind, which may be alternatively interpreted as a special case of the third kind, has sometimes been described since Quine's work:
 A paradox that is both true and false at the same time and in the same sense is called a dialetheia. In Western logics, it is often assumed, following Aristotle, that no dialetheia exist, but they are sometimes accepted in Eastern traditions (e.g. in the Mohists, the Gongsun Longzi, and in Zen) and in paraconsistent logics. It would be mere equivocation or a matter of degree, for example, to both affirm and deny that "John is here" when John is halfway through the door, but it is self-contradictory simultaneously to affirm and deny the event.

Ramsey's classification 
Frank Ramsey drew a distinction between logical paradoxes and semantic paradoxes, with Russell's paradox belonging to the former category, and the liar paradox and Grelling’s paradoxes to the latter.  Ramsey introduced the by-now standard distinction between logical and semantical contradictions. Logical contradictions involve mathematical or logical terms like class and number, and hence show that our logic or mathematics is problematic. Semantical contradictions involve, besides purely logical terms, notions like thought, language, and symbolism, which, according to Ramsey, are empirical (not formal) terms. Hence these contradictions are due to faulty ideas about thought or language, and they properly belong to epistemology.

In philosophy

A taste for paradox is central to the philosophies of Laozi, Zeno of Elea, Zhuangzi, Heraclitus, Bhartrhari, Meister Eckhart, Hegel, Kierkegaard, Nietzsche, and G.K. Chesterton, among many others. Søren Kierkegaard, for example, writes in the Philosophical Fragments that:
But one must not think ill of the paradox, for the paradox is the passion of thought, and the thinker without the paradox is like the lover without passion: a mediocre fellow. But the ultimate potentiation of every passion is always to will its own downfall, and so it is also the ultimate passion of the understanding to will the collision, although in one way or another the collision must become its downfall. This, then, is the ultimate paradox of thought: to want to discover something that thought itself cannot think.

In medicine

A paradoxical reaction to a drug is the opposite of what one would expect, such as becoming agitated by a sedative or sedated by a stimulant. Some are common and are used regularly in medicine, such as the use of stimulants such as Adderall and Ritalin in the treatment of attention deficit hyperactivity disorder (also known as ADHD), while others are rare and can be dangerous as they are not expected, such as severe agitation from a benzodiazepine.

The actions of antibodies on antigens can rarely take paradoxical turns in certain ways. One example is antibody-dependent enhancement (immune enhancement) of a disease's virulence; another is the hook effect (prozone effect), of which there are several types. However, neither of these problems is common, and overall, antibodies are crucial to health, as most of the time they do their protective job quite well.

In the smoker's paradox, cigarette smoking, despite its proven harms, has a surprising inverse correlation with the epidemiological incidence of certain diseases.

See also

References

Notes

Bibliography

 Frode Alfson Bjørdal, Librationist Closures of the Paradoxes, Logic and Logical Philosophy, Vol. 21 No. 4 (2012), pp. 323–361.
 Mark Sainsbury, 1988, Paradoxes, Cambridge: Cambridge University Press
 William Poundstone, 1989, Labyrinths of Reason: Paradox, Puzzles, and the Frailty of Knowledge, Anchor
 Roy Sorensen, 2005, A Brief History of the Paradox: Philosophy and the Labyrinths of the Mind, Oxford University Press
 Patrick Hughes, 2011, Paradoxymoron: Foolish Wisdom in Words and Pictures, Reverspective

External links

 
 
 
 
 
 

 
Concepts in epistemology
Concepts in logic
Concepts in metaphysics
Critical thinking
Philosophical logic
Thought